Eastlake is a city in Lake County, Ohio, United States. The population was 18,577 at the 2010 census. Dennis Morley is the current mayor of Eastlake. The city was named for the fact it is northeast of Cleveland, following along the shore of Lake Erie.

Eastlake is the site where Akron-based FirstEnergy's Eastlake Generating Station shut down at 1:31 P.M. EDT on August 14, 2003, leading to the 2003 North America blackout a few hours later.

Geography

Eastlake is about 19 miles northeast of Cleveland, Ohio, along the shore of Lake Erie, and is part of Greater Cleveland.

Demographics
94.3% spoke English and 2.9% spoke Croatian.

2010 census
As of the census of 2010, there were 18,577 people, 7,841 households, and 5,056 families residing in the city. The racial makeup of the city was 95.9% White, 1.4% African American, 0.1% Native American, 1.0% Asian, 0.3% from other races, and 1.2% from two or more races. Hispanic or Latino of any race were 1.4% of the population.

There were 7,841 households, of which 28.3% had children under the age of 18 living with them, 46.4% were married couples living together, 12.4% had a female householder with no husband present, 5.7% had a male householder with no wife present, and 35.5% were non-families. 29.7% of all households were made up of individuals, and 11.2% had someone living alone who was 65 years of age or older. The average household size was 2.37 and the average family size was 2.93.

The median age in the city was 42.7 years. 20.6% of residents were under the age of 18; 8.3% were between the ages of 18 and 24; 24.4% were from 25 to 44; 31.3% were from 45 to 64; and 15.4% were 65 years of age or older. The gender makeup of the city was 49.3% male and 50.7% female.

2000 census
As of the census of 2000, there were 20,255 people, 8,055 households, and 5,557 families residing in the city. The population density was 3,166.5 people per square mile (1,222.0/km2). There were 8,310 housing units at an average density of 1,299.1 per square mile (501.3/km2). The racial makeup of the city was 97.44% White, 0.54% African American, 0.16% Native American, 0.97% Asian, 0.01% Pacific Islander, 0.15% from other races, and 0.73% from two or more races. Hispanic or Latino of any race were 0.70% of the population. 17.1% were of German, 16.4% Italian, 15.1% Irish, 7.5% Polish, 6.1% Slovene and 5.7% English ancestry according to Census 2000.

There were 8,055 households, out of which 30.6% had children under the age of 18 living with them, 53.3% were married couples living together, 11.4% had a female householder with no husband present, and 31.0% were non-families. 26.3% of all households were made up of individuals, and 9.3% had someone living alone who was 65 years of age or older. The average household size was 2.51 and the average family size was 3.07.

In the city the population was spread out, with 23.8% under the age of 18, 8.1% from 18 to 24, 30.3% from 25 to 44, 25.7% from 45 to 64, and 12.1% who were 65 years of age or older. The median age was 38 years. For every 100 females, there were 95.3 males. For every 100 females age 18 and over, there were 94.4 males.

The median income for a household in the city was $43,297, and the median income for a family was $52,039. Males had a median income of $37,557 versus $27,135 for females. The per capita income for the city was $19,905. About 3.7% of families and 5.0% of the population were below the poverty line, including 6.4% of those under age 18 and 6.2% of those age 65 or over.

Schools
Eastlake is located in the Willoughby-Eastlake City School District.  Eastlake North High School, home of the Rangers, is one of two high schools in the district, and is located on Stevens Blvd. Eastlake Middle School and Jefferson Elementary School are located in the eastern part of the city, on the east side of the Chagrin River. Longfellow Elementary School is located in the center of the city, along Route 91 close to North High School. Washington Elementary School is in the northwestern part of the city and was closed after the 2014–2015 school year. Bryant and Stratton College is also located in Eastlake, Ohio on Curtis Blvd.

Sports and culture

Classic Park
Eastlake is home to Classic Park, the home field of the Lake County Captains, a Class A minor league baseball team affiliated with the Cleveland Guardians. Classic Park's construction included controversy involving finances.

Public library
Eastlake is served by a branch of the Willoughby-Eastlake Public Library.

Boulevard of 500 Flags
The Boulevard of 500 Flags, purported to be "the world's largest permanent display of American flags", is located in Eastlake.

Eternal Flame
"An Eternal Flame burns brightly and was donated to the City of Eastlake by the East Ohio Gas Company, commemorating the arrival of the Olympic Torch. A ceremony was held in Eastlake on June 10, 1996 as the Olympic Torch made its way through the United States from Greece to Atlanta for the 1996 Olympics. The Torch Ceremony attracted nearly 5,000 people to the area for that very special celebration."

2003 Northeast blackout
On August 14, 2003, the single largest blackout in North American history occurred. The blackout caused 50 million people to lose power in eight US states and southeastern Canada. Although it took months to diagnose the actual cause of the blackout, it was eventually traced back to a FirstEnergy powerplant in Eastlake, where a high-voltage power line brushed up against an overgrowth of trees causing the line to shut down, which, due to a failed alert system, caused a domino effect of power lines switching off. All in all, 11 people died and around $6 billion in damages were reported, prompting the creation of a joint energy task force between the US and Canada to minimize future blackouts.

Gallery

References

External links

 

Cities in Lake County, Ohio
Populated places established in 1797
Ohio populated places on Lake Erie
Cleveland metropolitan area
Cities in Ohio